Lendy Enrique Castillo Artiles (born April 8, 1989) is a Dominican former professional baseball pitcher. He has previously played for the Chicago Cubs of Major League Baseball (MLB).

Career

Philadelphia Phillies
Castillo signed with the Philadelphia Phillies as an international free agent. He debuted in the Phillies' minor league organization in 2007 as a shortstop. The Phillies converted Castillo into a pitcher in 2010, and he pitched for the Phillies' organization in 2010 and 2011. He was used primarily as a starting pitcher in 2010 and as a relief pitcher in 2011.

Chicago Cubs
The Cubs selected Castillo from the Phillies organization in the 2011 Rule 5 draft. Castillo made the Cubs' Opening Day roster. Castillo was designated for assignment on January 26, 2013, to make room for Carlos Villanueva. He cleared waivers and was outrighted to the Triple-A Iowa Cubs. Castillo began the 2013 season with the Class-A Kane County Cougars.

Toronto Blue Jays
On August 18, 2015, Castillo signed a minor league contract with the Toronto Blue Jays. He elected free agency on November 6, 2015.

Rangers/BlueJays
During the 2015 season, Castillo pitched in the Texas and Toronto organizations, seeing time with Class-A High Desert Mavericks, Class-A Dunedin Blue Jays and Double-A Frisco RoughRiders. In 27 games, including one start, between the three teams, Castillo posted a 2–2 record with a 4.78 ERA and 39 strikeouts.

Detroit Tigers
On December 11, 2015, Castillo signed a minor-league contract with the Detroit Tigers, and was invited to spring training. He was released on July 23, 2016.

Cleveland Indians
Castillo signed a minor league contract with the Cleveland Indians on August 1, 2016, but was released on August 12.

New Jersey Jackals
On March 14, 2018, Castillo signed with the New Jersey Jackals of the Can-Am League.

Generales de Durango
He left the team on June 8, 2018, to sign with the Generales de Durango of the Mexican Baseball League. He was released on July 14, 2018.

New Jersey Jackals (second stint)
On February 16, 2019, Castillo signed with the New Jersey Jackals of the Can-Am League. He became a free agent following the season.

References

External links

1989 births
Living people
Akron RubberDucks players
Arizona League Cubs players
Caribes de Anzoátegui players
Chicago Cubs players
Daytona Cubs players
Dominican Republic expatriate baseball players in Mexico
Dominican Republic expatriate baseball players in the United States
Dominican Summer League Phillies players
Dunedin Blue Jays players
Erie SeaWolves players
Estrellas Orientales players
Frisco RoughRiders players
Generales de Durango players
Florida Complex League Phillies players
High Desert Mavericks players
Kane County Cougars players
Lakewood BlueClaws players
Major League Baseball pitchers
Major League Baseball players from the Dominican Republic
Mexican League baseball pitchers
Mesa Solar Sox players
New Jersey Jackals players
Tennessee Smokies players
Williamsport Crosscutters players
Dominican Republic expatriate baseball players in Puerto Rico
Dominican Republic expatriate baseball players in Venezuela
Cangrejeros de Santurce (baseball) players